The 2005 Marlboro Masters of Formula 3 was the fifteenth Masters of Formula 3 race held at Circuit Park Zandvoort on 12 June 2005. It was won by Lewis Hamilton, for ASM Formule 3.

Drivers and teams

Classification

Race

See also
 2005 Formula 3 Euro Series season
 2005 British Formula 3 season

References

Masters of Formula Three
Masters
Masters
Masters of Formula Three